Khem Raj Gurung was a Nepali musician and singer. Many of his songs such as "Wari Jamuna Pari Jamuna" and "Bhanchhan Budapakhale" were the biggest chartbusters of their time. He was known for singing traditional and cultural songs which had moral lessons. He was one of the top singers in Nepal during the 1990s and 2000s. He died on 25 August 2016 following a severe liver infection.

Khem Raj Gurung was originally from Khandbari of Sankhuwasabha district and he is considered the only national level singers from Sankhuwasabha district. Gurung had given voice to a number of folk songs and nine music albums. The most popular songs of Khem Raj Gurung are “Wari Jamuna Pari Jamuna”, “Aaalutama le” and “Bhamchan Budapaka Le”. The albums of Khem Raj Guurng are - Jeevan, Jeevan-2, Aanamol, Dharan-Pokhara, Solti, Aalutama, Dhakre, Dhakre (Lokgeet), and Ghumphir.

References

20th-century Nepalese male singers
21st-century Nepalese male singers
1975 births
2016 deaths
People from Sankhuwasabha District
Dohori singers
Gurung people